Lisa Sheridan-Paolini (born 10 December 1962) is an Australian racewalker. She competed in the women's 20 kilometres walk at the 2000 Summer Olympics.

References

External links
 

1962 births
Living people
Athletes (track and field) at the 2000 Summer Olympics
Australian female racewalkers
Olympic athletes of Australia
Place of birth missing (living people)